McNulty Lake is a lake located in Lee County, Arkansas, United States between Little Rock, Arkansas and Memphis, Tennessee near Marianna, Arkansas.

References

Lakes of Arkansas
Bodies of water of Lee County, Arkansas